The Delhi state assembly elections 2003 were elections for the Legislative Assembly of Delhi held on 1 December 2003 with the results declared on 4 December.  The Indian National Congress retained control of the Legislative Assembly. Of the 70 elected legislators 63 were men and 7 women.

Result

Elected members

Source:

See also
 State Assembly elections in India, 2003
 First Legislative Assembly of Delhi
 Second Legislative Assembly of Delhi
 Third Legislative Assembly of Delhi
 Fourth Legislative Assembly of Delhi
 Fifth Legislative Assembly of Delhi
 Sixth Legislative Assembly of Delhi

References

External links
Legislative Assembly of Delhi, Official website

2003
Delhi
2000s in Delhi